Nehemy Jean (born 1931) is a Haitian painter and graphic artist. Born in Limbé, Jean worked as a graphic artist and studied portraiture. He painted murals at the Port-au-Prince International Airport. His works have been exhibited in Europe and the United States. He joined the Centre d'Art in 1947 and was active in the founding of the Foyer des Arts Plastique.

References
 
 

1931 births
Haitian painters
Haitian male painters
Living people